Spinipogon elaphroterus is a species of moth of the family Tortricidae. It is found in Costa Rica and in Mexico in the states of Tamaulipas and Veracruz.

References

Moths described in 1967
Cochylini